Carlton is a village and civil parish near the eastern boundary of the county of Cambridgeshire in the east of England. It is in the district of South Cambridgeshire. In 2001 the parish had a population of 166.

There are some pictures and a description of the church at the Cambridgeshire Churches website.

History 
On 1 April 1974 the parish was renamed from "Carlton cum Willingham" to "Carlton".

Notable residents
The most famous historical resident of Carlton was the scholar, diplomat, and author Sir Thomas Elyot. He died and was buried in Carlton in 1546.

References

 Census 2001 Profile
 Parish of Carlton-cum-Willingham

External links

Villages in Cambridgeshire
Civil parishes in Cambridgeshire
South Cambridgeshire District